An Orbita mouse is a wireless three-axis rotating computer mouse.  It was developed and patented by Cyba Sport and released in January 2009. The Orbita mouse combines rotation input with configurable button controls.

See also 
 Rotational mouse
 Scroll wheel

References

External links 
 Cyber Sport Orbita Mouse official website 

Computer mice